The Southeast Division can refer to the following:

 Southeast Division (NBA), in the National Basketball Association 
 Southeast Division (NHL), in the National Hockey League
 Southeast Division Street MAX Station, Portland, Oregon
 Queensland Rugby League South East Queensland Division